Deuchar is a surname. Notable people with the surname include: 

Alex Deuchar (born 1988), English cricketer
Alexander Deuchar (1777–1844), Scottish seal engraver 
Jimmy Deuchar (1930–1993), Scottish jazz trumpeter and big band arranger
Kenny Deuchar (born 1980), Scottish footballer
Stephen Deuchar (born 1957), British arts administrator

Given name
Deuchar Gordon (1871–1951), Australian pastoralist

See also
 Deuchars (surname)